Subharaja was King of Anuradhapura during the 1st century.  His reign lasted from 60 to 66. He succeeded Yasalalaka as King of Anuradhapura and was overthrown and succeeded by Vasabha, the first king of the Lambakanna dynasty. The end of Subharaja's reign marked the end of the House of Vijaya.

See also
 List of Sri Lankan monarchs
 History of Sri Lanka

References

External links
 Kings & Rulers of Sri Lanka
 Codrington's Short History of Ceylon

Monarchs of Anuradhapura
S
S
S